Dawn Fraser  (born 4 September 1937) is an Australian freestyle champion swimmer and former politician.  She is one of only four swimmers to have won the same Olympic individual event three times – in her case the women's 100-metre freestyle.

Early life
Fraser was born in the Sydney suburb of Balmain, New South Wales, in 1937 into a poor working-class family, the youngest of eight children. Her father, Kenneth Fraser, was from Embo, Scotland. She was spotted at the early age of 14 by Sydney coach Harry Gallagher swimming at the local sea baths.

Swimming career
Fraser won eight Olympic medals, including four gold medals, and six Commonwealth Games gold medals. She also held 39 records. The 100 metres freestyle record was hers for 15 years from 1 December 1956 to 8 January 1972.

She is the first of only four swimmers in Olympic history (Krisztina Egerszegi of Hungary, Michael Phelps and Katie Ledecky both from the United States being the three others) to have won individual gold medals for the same event at three successive Olympics (100 metres freestyle – 1956, 1960, 1964).

In October 1962, she became the first woman to swim 100 metres freestyle in less than one minute. It was not until 1972, eight years after Fraser retired, that her 100m record of 58.9 secs was broken.

Several weeks before the 1964 Olympics, Fraser was injured in a car crash that resulted in the death of her mother Rose. Her sister and a friend were also travelling in Fraser's car when it crashed, but they survived. This was a fresh tragedy for Fraser and her family following her older brother's death from leukaemia in 1950, and her father died after a long battle against cancer in 1960.

Controversy
During the 1964 Summer Olympics in Tokyo, Fraser angered swimming team sponsors and the Australian Swimming Union (ASU) by marching in the opening ceremony against their wishes, and wearing an older swimming costume in competition, as she found it more comfortable than the one supplied by the sponsors. She was also accused of stealing an Olympic flag from a flagpole outside Emperor Hirohito's palace, the Kōkyo. She was arrested but released without charge. In the end she was given the flag as a souvenir. She later denied having swum the moat to steal the flag, telling The Times in 1991: "There's no way I would have swum that moat. I was terrified of dirty water and that moat was filthy. There's no way I'd have dipped my toe in it."
The Australian Amateur Swimming Association banned Fraser from competitive swimming for 10 years.

In 1997, Fraser told the ABC: "I mean I wish I could be as outspoken, I suppose, as Pauline Hanson and say, 'look, I'm sick and tired of the immigrants that are coming into my country.'" Fraser also stated her interest in joining Hanson's One Nation Party.

In 2015, during an interview on the Today program, Fraser was asked about recent behaviour of Nick Kyrgios at Wimbledon and Bernard Tomic’s comments about Tennis Australia, which resulted in Tomic being removed from the Davis Cup team. Fraser said, "They should be setting a better example for the younger generation of this country ... If they don’t like it, go back to where their fathers or their parents came from". (Kyrgios is of Malay and Greek ancestry, while Tomic is of Croat extraction.) Kyrgios responded by describing her as a "blatant racist", and Fraser's comments were criticised by Australia’s Race Discrimination Commissioner, Tim Soutphommasane. Fraser "unreservedly" apologised for her comments.

Post-swimming activities
Fraser became a publican at the Riverview Hotel, Balmain, and took up swimming coaching. In 1988, she was elected as an independent to the New South Wales Legislative Assembly for the seat of Balmain. That electorate was abolished in 1991, and after she failed to win the new seat of Port Jackson, she retired from politics. Fraser is a high-profile supporter and a board director of the Wests Tigers NRL club.

Honours
She was named the Australian of the Year in 1964, was inducted into the International Swimming Hall of Fame in 1965, (as Dawn Ware) was made a Member of the Order of the British Empire (MBE) in 1967, and appointed an Officer of the Order of Australia (AO) in 1998.  Also in 1998, she was voted Australia's greatest female athlete in history.  She was named Australian Female Athlete of the Century by the Sport Australia Hall of Fame, who had inducted her as their first female member in 1985.  In 1999 the International Olympic Committee named her the World's Greatest Living Female Water Sports Champion. on 14 July 2000, Fraser was awarded the Australian Sports Medal for "outstanding contribution as a swimming competitor".

She was one of the bearers of the Olympic Torch at the opening ceremony of the 2000 Summer Olympics in Sydney. She carried the Olympic Torch at the stadium, as one of the bearers for the final segment, before the lighting of the Olympic Flame.

The Australian Sport Awards includes an award named in honour of and presented by Fraser. The sea baths in Balmain where she swam were named the Dawn Fraser Swimming Pool in her honour in 1964, and in 1992, the State Transit Authority named a RiverCat ferry after Fraser.

As part of the 2018 Queen's Birthday Honours she was advanced to a Companion of the Order of Australia (AC).

In 2022, she was an inaugural inductee of the Swimming Australia Hall of Fame.

In film
In 1979, a movie called Dawn! was made about Fraser's life and career. It starred Bronwyn Mackay-Payne as Fraser.

Fraser was played by Melissa Thomas in the 2003 film Swimming Upstream. Fraser herself is credited in the film as Dawn Fraser's coach.
On  1 September 2015, Dawn Fraser featured on Season 7, Episode 5, of the SBS genealogy television series Who Do You Think You Are?, which traced her heritage back to South America.

Personal life 
Fraser married Gary Ware on 30 January 1965 at St Stephens Church, Macquarie Street, Sydney. The marriage was short-lived. She has one daughter from the marriage, who has a son. They all live in Noosa on the Sunshine Coast in Queensland. This move north from Sydney to a warmer, subtropical climate was due to the fact Fraser suffers from severe asthma. She is the great-aunt of Canadian soccer player Danielle Steer.

Olympic accomplishments

1962 Perth Commonwealth Games
110 yards freestyle – gold medal
440 yards freestyle – gold medal
4 × 110 yards (4 × 100.58 metres) freestyle relay – gold medal
4 × 110 yards (4 × 100.58 metres) medley relay – gold medal

See also
 List of members of the International Swimming Hall of Fame
 List of multiple Olympic gold medalists
 List of multiple Olympic gold medalists in one event
 List of multiple Summer Olympic medalists
 List of Olympic medalists in swimming (women)
 World record progression 100 metres freestyle
 World record progression 200 metres freestyle
 World record progression 4 × 100 metres freestyle relay

References

External links

 
 
 
 
 
 
 

1937 births
Australian female freestyle swimmers
Olympic swimmers of Australia
Swimmers from Sydney
Swimmers at the 1956 Summer Olympics
Swimmers at the 1960 Summer Olympics
Swimmers at the 1964 Summer Olympics
Swimmers at the 1958 British Empire and Commonwealth Games
Swimmers at the 1962 British Empire and Commonwealth Games
Olympic gold medalists for Australia
Olympic silver medalists for Australia
Commonwealth Games gold medallists for Australia
Commonwealth Games silver medallists for Australia
World record setters in swimming
Australian sportsperson-politicians
Independent members of the Parliament of New South Wales
Members of the New South Wales Legislative Assembly
Australian autobiographers
Australian of the Year Award winners
Companions of the Order of Australia
Australian Members of the Order of the British Empire
Recipients of the Australian Sports Medal
Sport Australia Hall of Fame inductees
Living people
Women autobiographers
Australian people of Scottish descent
Medalists at the 1964 Summer Olympics
Medalists at the 1960 Summer Olympics
Medalists at the 1956 Summer Olympics
Olympic gold medalists in swimming
Olympic silver medalists in swimming
Commonwealth Games medallists in swimming
Women members of the New South Wales Legislative Assembly
The Apprentice Australia candidates
Medallists at the 1958 British Empire and Commonwealth Games
Medallists at the 1962 British Empire and Commonwealth Games